Darian King was the defending champion but chose not to defend his title.

Cameron Norrie won the title after defeating Jordan Thompson 6–4, 0–6, 6–4 in the final.

Seeds

Draw

Finals

Top half

Bottom half

References
Main Draw
Qualifying Draw

Levene Gouldin and Thompson Tennis Challenger - Singles
2017 Singles
2017 Levene Gouldin & Thompson Tennis Challenger